Otosaurus cumingii, commonly called Cuming's sphenomorphus or the Luzon giant forest skink, is a species of skink, a lizard in the family Scincidae. The species is endemic to the Philippines.

Etymology
The specific name, cumingii, is in honor of English naturalist Hugh Cuming.

Habitat

Description
The Luzon giant forest skink reaches a total length (including tail) of 35 cm (14 inches).

Behavior
O. cumingii tends to hide under leaves and logs.

References

Further reading
Boulenger GA (1887). Catalogue of the Lizards in the British Museum (Natural History). Second Edition. Volume III. ... Scincidæ ... London: Trustees of the British Museum (Natural History). (Taylor and Francis, printers). xii + 575 pp. + Plates I-XL. (Lygosoma cumingii, p. 249 + Plate XVI, figure 2).
Gray JE (1845). Catalogue of the Specimens of Lizards in the Collection of the British Museum. London: Trustees of the British Museum. (Edward Newman, printer). xxviii + 289 pp. (Otosaurus cumingii, new species, p. 93).
Linkem CW, Diesmos AC, Brown RM (2011). "Molecular systematics of the Philippine forest skinks (Squamata: Scincidae: Sphenomorphus): testing morphological hypotheses of interspecific relationships". Zoological Journal of the Linnean Society 163: 1217–1243. (Otosaurus cumingii, new combination).

Skinks
Endemic fauna of the Philippines
Reptiles of the Philippines
Reptiles described in 1845
Taxa named by John Edward Gray